Mac OS X Tiger (version 10.4) is the 5th major release of macOS, Apple's desktop and server operating system for Mac computers. Tiger was released to the public on April 29, 2005 for US$129.95 as the successor to Mac OS X 10.3 Panther. Some of the new features included a fast searching system called Spotlight, a new version of the Safari web browser, Dashboard, a new 'Unified' theme, and improved support for 64-bit addressing on Power Mac G5s. Mac OS X 10.4 Tiger offered a number of features, such as fast file searching and improved graphics processing, that Microsoft had spent several years struggling to add to Windows with acceptable performance.

Mac OS X 10.4 Tiger was included with all new Macs, and was also available as an upgrade for existing Mac OS X users, or users of supported pre-Mac OS X systems. The server edition, Mac OS X Server 10.4, was also available for some Macintosh product lines. Six weeks after its official release, Apple had delivered 2 million copies of Mac OS X 10.4 Tiger, representing 16% of all Mac OS X users. Apple claimed that Mac OS X 10.4 Tiger was the most successful Apple OS release in the company's history. At the WWDC on June 11, 2007, Apple's CEO, Steve Jobs, announced that out of the 22 million Mac OS X users, more than 67% were using Mac OS X 10.4 Tiger.

Apple announced a transition to Intel x86 processors during Mac OS X 10.4 Tiger's lifetime, making it the first Apple operating system to work on Apple–Intel architecture machines. The original Apple TV, released in March 2007, shipped with a customized version of Mac OS X 10.4 Tiger branded "Apple TV OS" that replaced the usual GUI with an updated version of Front Row.

Mac OS X 10.4 Tiger was succeeded by Mac OS X 10.5 Leopard on October 26, 2007, after 30 months, making Mac OS X 10.4 Tiger the longest-running version of Mac OS X. The last security update released for Mac OS X 10.4 Tiger users was the 2009-005 update. The latest supported version of QuickTime is 7.6.4. The latest version of iTunes that can run on Mac OS X 10.4 Tiger is 9.2.1. Safari 4.1.3 is the final version for Mac OS X 10.4 Tiger.

Despite not having received security updates since then, Mac OS X 10.4 Tiger remains popular with Power Mac users and retrocomputing enthusiasts due to its wide software and hardware compatibility, as it is the last Mac OS X version to support the Classic Environment – a Mac OS 9 compatibility layer – and PowerPC G3 processors.

System requirements
Mac OS X 10.4 Tiger was initially available in a PowerPC edition, with an Intel edition released beginning at Mac OS X 10.4.4 Tiger. There is no universal version of the client operating system, although Mac OS X 10.4 Tiger Server was made available on a universal DVD from version Mac OS X 10.4.7 Tiger. While Apple shipped the PowerPC edition bundled with PowerPC-based Macs and also sold it as a separate retail box, the only way to obtain the Intel version was to buy an Intel-based Mac bundled with it. However, it was possible to buy the 'restore' DVDs containing the Intel version through unofficial channels such as eBay, and officially through Apple if one could provide proof of purchase of the appropriate Intel Mac. These grey-colored ‘restore’ DVDs supplied with new Macs, are designed to only restore on the model of Mac that they are intended for. However, they can be modified to work on any Intel Mac. The retail PowerPC-only DVD can be used on any PowerPC-based Mac supported by Mac OS X 10.4 Tiger.

The system requirements of the PowerPC edition are:

Macintosh computer with a PowerPC G3, G4 or G5 processor
Built-in FireWire
DVD drive for installation
256MB of RAM
3GB of available hard disk space (4GB if the user installs the developer tools)

Mac OS X 10.4 Tiger removed support for older New World ROM Macs such as the original iMacs and iBooks that were supported in Mac OS X 10.3 Panther; however it is possible to install Mac OS X 10.4 Tiger on these Macs using third-party software (such as XPostFacto) that overrides the checks made at the beginning of the installation process. Likewise, machines such as beige Power Mac G3s and ‘Wall Street’ PowerBook G3s that were dropped by Mac OS X 10.3 Panther can also be made to run both Mac OS X 10.3 Panther and Mac OS X 10.4 Tiger in this way. Also, Mac OS X 10.4 Tiger can be installed on unsupported New World ROM Macs by installing it on a supported Mac, then swapping hard drives. Old World ROM Macs require the use of XPostFacto to install Mac OS X 10.4 Tiger.

Mac OS X 10.4 Tiger was the last version of Mac OS X to support the PowerPC G3 processor.

History
Apple CEO Steve Jobs first presented Mac OS X 10.4 Tiger in his keynote presentation at the WWDC on June 28, 2004, ten months before its commercial release in April 2005. Four months before that official release, several non-commercial, developer's releases of Mac OS X 10.4 Tiger leaked onto the internet via BitTorrent file sharers. It was first mentioned on Apple's website on May 4, 2004. Apple sued these file sharers. On April 12, 2005, Apple announced Mac OS X 10.4 Tiger's official, worldwide release would be April 29. All Apple Stores around the world held Mac OS X 10.4 Tiger seminars, presentations and demos.

On June 6, 2005 at the WWDC in San Francisco, Jobs reported that nearly two million copies had been sold in Mac OS X 10.4 Tiger's first six weeks of release, making Mac OS X 10.4 Tiger the most successful operating system release in Apple's history. Jobs then disclosed that Mac OS X had been engineered from its inception to work with Intel's x86 line of processors in addition to the PowerPC, the CPU for which the operating system had always been publicly marketed. Apple concurrently announced its intent to release the first x86-based computers in June 2006, and to move the rest of its computers to x86 microprocessors by June 2007. On January 10, 2006, Apple presented its new iMac and MacBook Pro computers running on Intel Core Duo processors, and announced that the entire Apple product line would run on Intel processors by the end of 2006. Apple then released the Mac Pro and announced the new Xserve on August 8, completing the Intel transition in 210 days, roughly ten months ahead of the original schedule.

Mac OS X 10.4 Tiger is the first version of Mac OS X to be supplied on a DVD, although the DVD could originally be exchanged for CDs for $9.95. It is also currently the only version of Mac OS X/OS X/macOS that had an update version number ending with a value greater than 9, as the last version of Mac OS X 10.4 Tiger was 10.4.11.

New and changed features

End-user features
Apple advertises that Mac OS X 10.4 Tiger has over 150 new and improved features, including:

Spotlight — Spotlight is a full-text and metadata search engine which can search everything on one's Mac, including Microsoft Word documents, iCal calendars and Address Book contact cards. The feature is also used to build the concept of ‘smart folders’ into the Finder. Spotlight will index files as they are saved, so they can be quickly and easily found through a search-as-you-type box in the menu bar. As a side-effect, it adds hidden folders and indexing files to removable media like USB flash drives.
iChat AV — The new iChat AV 3.0 in Mac OS X 10.4 Tiger supports up to four participants in a video conference and ten participants in an audio conference. It also now supports communication using the XMPP protocol. A XMPP server called iChat Server is included on Mac OS X 10.4 Tiger Server.
Safari RSS — The new Safari 2.0 web browser in Mac OS X 10.4 Tiger features a built-in reader for RSS and Atom web syndication that can be accessed easily from an RSS button in the address bar of the web browser window. An updated version of Safari, included as part of the free Mac OS X 10.4.3 Tiger update, can also pass the Acid2 web standards test.
Mail 2 — The new version of Mail.app email client included in Mac OS X 10.4 Tiger featured an updated interface, "Smart Mailboxes", which utilizes the Spotlight search system, parental controls, as well as several other features.
Automator — A scripting tool to link applications together to form complex automated workflows (written in AppleScript, Cocoa, or both). Automator comes with a complete library of actions for several applications that can be used together to make a Workflow.
VoiceOver — screen reader interface similar to Jaws for Windows and other Windows screen readers that offers the blind and visually impaired user keyboard control and spoken English descriptions of what is happening on screen. VoiceOver enables users with visual impairment to use applications via keyboard commands. VoiceOver is capable of reading aloud the contents of files including web pages, mail messages and word processing files. Complete keyboard navigation lets the user control the computer with the keyboard rather than the mouse, a menu is displayed in a window showing all the available keyboard commands that can be used.
A complete built-in Dictionary/Thesaurus based on the New Oxford American Dictionary, Second Edition, accessible through an application, Dictionary, a Dashboard widget, and as a system-wide command (see below).
.Mac syncing — Though this is not a new feature, .Mac syncing in Tiger is much improved over Panther. Syncing tasks in Tiger are now accomplished through the .Mac system preferences pane rather than the iSync application.
QuickTime 7 — A new version of Apple's multimedia software has support for the new H.264/AVC codec, which offers better quality and scalability than other video codecs.  This new codec is used by iChat AV for clearer video conferencing. New classes within Cocoa provide full access to QuickTime for Cocoa application developers. The new QuickTime 7 player application bundled with Tiger now includes more advanced audio and video controls as well as a more detailed Information dialog, and the new player has been rebuilt using Apple's Cocoa API to take advantage of the new technologies more easily.
New Unix features — New versions of cp, mv, and rsync that support files with resource forks. Command-line support for features like the above-mentioned Spotlight are also included.
Xcode 2.0 — Xcode 2.0, Apple's Cocoa development tool now includes visual modelling, an integrated Apple Reference Library and graphical remote debugging.

New applications in Tiger
Dashboard — The Dashboard is a new mini-applications layer based on HTML, CSS, and JavaScript, which returns the desk accessories concept to Mac OS. These accessories are known as widgets. It comes with several widgets such as Weather, World Clock, Unit Converter, Dictionary/Thesaurus, and others (full list). More are available to download for free online. Its similarity to the Konfabulator application caused some criticism.
Automator — Automator uses workflows to process repetitive tasks automatically
Grapher — Grapher is a new application capable of creating 2D and 3D graphs similar to those of Graphing Calculator.
Dictionary — A dictionary and thesaurus program that uses the New Oxford American Dictionary. It has a fast GUI for displaying the Dictionary, and allows the user to search the dictionary with Spotlight, to print definitions, and to copy and paste text into documents. Dictionary also provides a Dictionary service in the Application menu, and Cocoa and WebKit provides a global keyboard shortcut (ctrl-⌘-D by default) for all applications that display text with them. Its use was furthered in the next version of OS X by providing definitions from Wikipedia. The Dictionary application is a more feature-filled version of the Dictionary widget.
Quartz Composer — Quartz Composer is a development tool for processing and rendering graphical data.
AU Lab — AU Lab is a developer application for testing and mixing Audio Units.

Improvements
An upgraded kernel with optimized kernel resource locking and access control lists, and with support for 64-bit userland address spaces on machines with 64-bit processors.
An updated libSystem with both 32-bit and 64-bit versions; combined with the aforementioned kernel change, this allows individual applications to address more than 4 GB of memory when run on 64-bit processors, although an application using Apple libraries or frameworks other than libSystem would need to have two processes, one running the 64-bit code and one running the code that requires other libraries and frameworks.
A new startup daemon called launchd that allows for faster booting.
The printing dialog in Tiger now features a drop down menu for creating PDFs, sending PDFs to Mail, and other PDF related actions. However, the user interface was criticized for creating a hybrid widget that looks like a plain button but acts like a pop-up menu. This is one of only three places in the entire Mac OS X interface where such an element appears.
Dock menus now have menu items to open an application at login, or to remove the icon from the dock.
The Window menu in the Finder now features a "Cycle Through Windows" menu item.
The Get Info window for items in the Finder now includes a "More Info" section that includes Spotlight information tags such as Image Height & Width, when the file was last opened, and where the file originated.
Early development of resolution independence. Apple notes that this will be a user-level feature in a future version of Mac OS X. Among the changes, the maximum size of icons was increased to 256x256. However, the Finder does not yet support this size.

Technologies

A new graphics processing API, Core Image, leveraging the power of the available accelerated graphics cards.
Core Image allows programmers to easily leverage programmable GPUs for fast image processing for special effects and image correction tools. Some of the included Image Units are Blur, Color Blending, Generator Filters, Distortion Filters, Geometry Filters, Halftone features and much more.
A new data persistence API, Core Data, that makes it easier for developers to handle structured data in their applications.
The Mac OS X Core Data API helps developers create data structures for their applications. Core Data provides undo, redo and save functions for developers without them having to write any code.
A new video graphics API, Core Video, which leverages Core Image to provide real-time video processing.
Apple's Motion real-time video effects program takes advantage of Core Video in Tiger. Core Video lets developers easily integrate real-time video effects and processing into their applications.
Core Audio integrates a range of audio functionality directly into the operating system.

Interface differences
In Tiger, the menu bar displayed at the top of the screen now features a colored Spotlight button in the upper right corner; the menu itself has a smoother 'glassy' texture to replace the faint pinstripes in Panther.

Also of note, Tiger introduces a new window theme, often described as 'Unified'. A variation on the standard, non-brushed metal theme used since the introduction of Mac OS X, this theme integrates the title bar and the toolbar of a window. A prominent example of an application that utilizes this theme is Mail.

Accessibility
Tiger was the first version of Mac OS X to include the "Zoom" screen magnifier functionality, which allowed the user to zoom on to the area around the mouse by holding CONTROL and scrolling the mouse wheel up or down (to zoom in and out respectively).

Tiger trademark lawsuit
Shortly before the release of Mac OS X Tiger, the computer retailer TigerDirect.com, Inc. filed a lawsuit against Apple, alleging that Apple infringed TigerDirect.com's trademark with the Mac OS X Tiger operating system.

The following is a quotation from TigerDirect.com's court memorandum:

Apple Computer's use of its infringing family of Tiger marks to expand sales of products besides its operating system software is already evident — for example, Apple Computer is offering free iPods and laptops as part of its Tiger World Premiere giveaway. In short, notwithstanding its representation to the PTO that it would only use Tiger in connection with their unique computer operating system software, Apple Computer has in recent weeks used a family of Tiger marks in connection with a substantially broader group of products and services, including the very products and services currently offered by Tiger Direct under its famous family of Tiger marks.

In 2005 TigerDirect was denied a preliminary injunction that would have prevented Apple from using the mark while the case was decided. Apple and TigerDirect reached a settlement in 2006, after which TigerDirect withdrew its opposition.

Support for Intel processors

At Apple's 2005 Worldwide Developers Conference, CEO Steve Jobs announced that the company would begin selling Mac computers with Intel x86 processors in 2006. To allow developers to begin producing software for these Intel-based Macs, Apple made available a prototype Intel-based Mac ("Developer Transition Kit") that included a version of Mac OS X v10.4.1 designed to run on x86 processors.

This build included Apple's Rosetta compatibility layer — a translation process that allows x86-based versions of the OS to run software designed for PowerPC with a moderate performance penalty. This is contrasted with the contemporary Mac OS 9 Classic mode, which used comparably larger amounts of system resources.

Soon after the Developer Transition Kits began shipping, copies of Tiger x86 were leaked onto file sharing networks. Although Apple had implemented a Trusted Computing DRM scheme in the transition hardware and OS in an attempt to stop people installing Tiger x86 on non-Apple PCs, the OSx86 project soon managed to remove this restriction. As Apple released each update with newer safeguards to prevent its use on non-Apple hardware, unofficially modified versions were released that circumvented Apple's safeguards. However, with the release of 10.4.5, 10.4.6, and 10.4.7 the unofficially modified versions continued to use the kernel from 10.4.4 because later kernels have hardware locks and depend heavily on EFI. By late 2006, the 10.4.8 kernel had been cracked.

At MacWorld San Francisco 2006, Jobs announced the immediate availability of Mac OS X v10.4.4, the first publicly available release of Tiger compiled for both PowerPC- and Intel x86-based machines.

Release history

Timeline

References

External links

Ars Technica Mac OS X Tiger Review at Ars Technica
Mac OS X Tiger at Wikibooks

4
IA-32 operating systems
X86-64 operating systems
PowerPC operating systems
2005 software
Computer-related introductions in 2005